Joaquín María del Castillo y Lanzas (11 November 1801 – 6 July 1878) was a Mexican politician who served twice as Secretary of Foreign Affairs (1846 and 1858–1859) and ten days as interim Secretary of Finance (1846) in the cabinet of Mariano Paredes.

As a diplomat, he also served as Envoy Extraordinary and Minister Plenipotentiary of Mexico to the United Kingdom (1853–1855) and twice as chargé d'affaires of Mexico to the United States (1834–1836 and 1836–1837).

Aside from his political and diplomatic activities, Del Castillo wrote poetry, worked as a journalist and editor for several publications and translated the works of Lord Byron.

Biography
He was born on 11 November 1801. He served as Envoy Extraordinary and Minister Plenipotentiary of Mexico to the United Kingdom from 1853 to 1855. He died on 6 July 1878

Works
 (1826)
 (1832)
 (1865)
 (1882)

Notes and references

1801 births
1878 deaths
Politicians from Xalapa
Politicians from Veracruz
Mexican Secretaries of Finance
Mexican Secretaries of Foreign Affairs
Members of the Chamber of Deputies (Mexico)
Ambassadors of Mexico to the United States
Ambassadors of Mexico to the United Kingdom
Alumni of the University of Glasgow